Aquiflexum is a Gram-negative, aerobic, heterotrophic and non-motile bacterial genus from the family of Cyclobacteriaceae with one known species (Aquiflexum balticum).

References

Further reading 
 
 

Cytophagia
Bacteria genera
Monotypic bacteria genera